This is a list of the German Media Control Top100 Singles Chart number-ones of 1993.

Number-one hits by week

Notes

References

 German Singles Chart Archives from 1956
 Media Control Chart Archives from 1960

Numb
Germany
1993
1993